The Barabati Stadium is an Indian sports stadium used mostly for cricket and association football, and also sometimes for concerts and field hockey, located in Cuttack, Odisha. It is a regular venue for international cricket and is the home ground of Odisha cricket team. The stadium is owned and operated by the Odisha Cricket Association. It is also used for Association Football. It hosts Santosh Trophy national football tournament  and the state's Odisha First Division League football matches.  The Barabati Stadium is one of the older grounds in India, having hosted several touring sides – including the MCC, the West Indies team and the Australians – before it hosted its first international match. It hosted only the third one-day international in this country, in January 1982, when India put it across England by five wickets to lift the series 2–1. It hosted its first ever Test match five years later where India played hosts to Sri Lanka. Though it isn't one of the regular Test venues anymore, it continues to enjoy the status of international venue and hosts One-Day Internationals regularly. It also hosted the 2013 Women's Cricket World Cup.

The cricket and football venue is equipped with floodlights for day-and-night games and is a regular venue for ODI matches. It was an adopted home venue for former Indian Premier League franchise Deccan Chargers. Barabati Stadium has successfully served as the venue for both Indian Premier League and the now defunct Odisha Premier League. It has also hosted Senior Women's T20 Challenger Trophy 2020 from 4–11 January 2020.

History and development

The Barabati Stadium in Cuttack hosted only the third One Day International in this country, in January 1982, when India beat England by five wickets to lift the series 2–1. In the first Test match here, five seasons later, the Sri Lankans were greeted with an underprepared wicket affording vastly unpredictable bounce. Dilip Vengsarkar, then at the most dizzying heights of his career, made his highest Test score of 166, his fourth century in eight Tests, when no other batsman on either side crossed 60. The Lankans were rolled over twice as India seized an innings and 67-run victory. Kapil Dev bagged his 300th Test victim, bowling Rumesh Ratnayake with a ball that failed to sit up.

The only other Test match here, against New Zealand in 1995–96, was badly affected by rain, affording less than 180 overs of playing time. Narendra Hirwani, on a comeback trail, took 6 for 59 in New Zealand's only innings, the best bowling figures here.

Though it isn't one of the regular Test venues anymore, it continues to enjoy the status of international venue and hosts One-Day Internationals regularly. India have won one of the two Test matches played here, and have an 11–4 win–loss record in ODIs.

Indoor Hall 

In 2012, OCA named the indoor cricket hall at Barabati Stadium after Sachin Tendulkar.

International cricket centuries

Key
 * denotes that the batsman was not out.
 Inns. denotes the number of the innings in the match.
 Balls denotes the number of balls faced in an innings.
 NR denotes that the number of balls was not recorded.
 Parentheses next to the player's score denotes his century number at the Feroz Shah Kotla.
 The column title Date refers to the date the match started.
 The column title Result refers to match result

Test centuries

The following table summarises the Test centuries scored at the Barabati Stadium.

One Day Centuries

The following table summarises the One Day centuries scored at the Barabati Stadium.

International cricket five-wicket hauls

Key

Tests

Records

Match Information:
{| border=0 cellpadding=5 cellspacing=1 width=25%
|- style="background:#999; color:black;"
! Game Type
! No. of Games
|- style="background:#ccc;"
| Test Matches
| 2
|- style="background:#ccc;"
| ODI
| 19
|- style="background:#ccc;"
| T20I
| 2
|}

Test Match Statistics:
{| border=0 cellpadding=3 cellspacing=1 width=50%
|- style="background:#999; color:black;"
! Category
! Information
|- style="background:#ccc;"
| Highest Team Score
| India (400 All Out against Sri Lanka)
|- style="background:#ccc;"
| Lowest Team Score
| Sri Lanka (142 All Out against India)
|- style="background:#ccc;"
| Best Batting Performance
| Dilip Vengsarkar (166 Runs against Sri Lanka)
|- style="background:#ccc;"
| Best Bowling Performance
| Narendra Hirwani (6/59 against New Zealand)
|}

ODI Match Statistics:
{| border=0 cellpadding=3 cellspacing=1 width=50%
|- style="background:#999; color:black;"
! Category
! Information
|- style="background:#ccc;"
| Highest Team Score
| India (381/6 in 50 Overs against England)
|- style="background:#ccc;"
| Lowest Team Score
| West Indies (113 All Out in 34.2 Overs against Australia)
|- style="background:#ccc;"
| Best Batting Performance
| Mohammad Azharuddin (153* Runs against Zimbabwe)
|- style="background:#ccc;"
| Best Bowling Performance
| Daren Powell (4/27 against India)
|}

Notable events

 Kapil Dev bagged his 300th test wicket when he bowled Rumesh Ratnayake of Sri Lanka in January 1987
 The Stadium hosted matches in two World Cups hosted in the subcontinent – 1987 Cricket World Cup (Australia beat Zimbabwe by 70 runs)and 1996 Cricket World Cup (India beat Kenya by 7 Wickets)
 Mohammad Azharuddin and Ajay Jadeja put on an unbroken 275 run partnership against Zimbabwe which was the then highest ODI partnership
 The above partnership is the current world record for the 4th Wicket in ODI Cricket.
 The partnership is the current world record for any unbroken partnership.
 The most runs scored here in Test cricket was by India who were all out for 400 in 1987 and 298–8 in 1995. The third highest score was by Sri Lanka who were dismassed for 191 runs in 1987.
 In Test cricket, the most runs scored here was by Dilip Vengsarkar(166 runs) followed by Kapil Dev(60 runs) and Sri Lankan Roy Dias(58 runs).
 The most wickets were taken by Narendra Hirwani and Maninder Singh(6 wickets each) followed by Sri Lankan Ravi Ratnayeke and Kapil Dev (5 wickets each).
 In ODIs, the highest score was made by India who scored 381–6 in 2017.
 In ODIs, highest individual score at the venue is 152* by Mohammad Azharuddin against Zimbabwe.
 The most runs scored here was by Sachin Tendulkar with 469 runs, followed by Ajay Jadeja with 273 runs and M Azharuddin with 242 runs.
 The most wickets taken here was by Anil Kumble, Ishant Sharma and Ajit Agarkar all with 7 wickets each
 Yuvraj Singh got his 14th  odi century as well as highest run 150 here

Santosh Trophy 2012
This stadium was the main venue of the 2012 Santosh Trophy football tournament which was won by Services.

See also
 List of Test cricket grounds

References

https://www.news18.com/cricketnext/newstopics/barabati-stadium.html

Test cricket grounds in India
Cricket grounds in Odisha
Football venues in Odisha
Buildings and structures in Cuttack
1987 Cricket World Cup stadiums
1996 Cricket World Cup stadiums
1958 establishments in Orissa
Sports venues completed in 1958
20th-century architecture in India